Sing, Cowboy, Sing is a 1937 American Western film directed by Robert N. Bradbury and starring Tex Ritter and White Flash.

Plot
Drifters Tex and Duke happen to ride upon the massacre of a group hauling freight for the community by a gang hired by someone who wishes the lucrative business by himself so he can run the entire valley.  Taking the only survivor, Madge daughter of the late owner of the freight hauling line to the nearest town, Tex and Duke take over the dangerous hauling business themselves for Madge.

The pair get jobs as entertainers in Judge Roy Dean's (according to a title card of the film, not based on Judge Roy Bean) combination saloon and courtroom to discover who is responsible for the massacre.

Cast 
Tex Ritter as Tex Archer
White Flash as Tex Archer's horse
Louise Stanley as Madge Summers
Al St. John as Duke Evans
Charles King as Henchman Red Holman
Karl Hackett as Kalmus
Robert McKenzie as Judge Roy Dean
Horace Murphy as Marshal Tinker
'Snub' Pollard as Man fined $28
Hank Worden as Henchman
Chick Hannon as Henchman Joe
Milburn Morante as Zeke
Oscar Gahan as Townsman
The Texas Tornadoes as Saloon musicians

Soundtrack 
 Tex Ritter with Al St. John - "Goodbye Old Paint, I'm a-Leavin' Cheyenne"
 Tex Ritter - "Get A Horse and Saddle"
 The Texas Tornadoes - "I'm A Natural Born Cowboy"
 Tex Ritter with The Texas Tornadoes - "Sing, Cowboy, Sing"

External links 

1937 films
1930s English-language films
American black-and-white films
1937 Western (genre) films
Grand National Films films
American Western (genre) films
Films directed by Robert N. Bradbury
1930s American films